Ingraham High School is a public high school, serving grades 9–12 in the Haller Lake neighborhood of Seattle, Washington, United States. Opened in 1959, the school is named after Edward Sturgis Ingraham, the first superintendent of the Seattle Public Schools. Since 2002, Ingraham has been an International Baccalaureate school, and also offers programs such as the Academy of Information Technology.  Since the 2011 school year, Ingraham has also offered an accelerated model of the International Baccalaureate program (IBx), modeled on a similar program in Bellevue School District, allowing students in Seattle Public Schools' highly capable cohort (formerly Accelerated Progress Program).

History
On May 10, 2011, Seattle Schools Superintendent Susan Enfield fired the principal, Martin Floe. A week later, on May 18, after a series of protests, Enfield reversed her decision and Floe was reinstated.

On November 8, 2022, a shooting took place at the school, killing one student. A suspect in the shooting was taken into police custody shortly after the shooting occurred, and was charged with first-degree firearms violations and Premeditated murder a week later. 

On  November 14, 2022 Ingraham and other Seattle Public Schools students had a walk out, asking for increased training for security on de-escalation and anti-racism, as well as updated safe storage laws and an increase in the number of mental health counselors.

The New Ingraham

The IB Program
The IB program at Ingraham is led by program coordinator Mr. Guy Thomas. This programs provides the students of Ingraham High School with the opportunity to take advanced classes that can be used for college credits. While the IB Program at Ingraham High School has been criticized due to a lack of diversity, Ingraham High School continues to offer IB as an option.

An International School
Under the direction of the International Education department, for the 2013–2014 school year, Ingraham's official title changed to Ingraham International School to signify the first year of the Language Immersion pathway being implemented at the school and to strengthen the connection with one of its main feeder schools, Hamilton International Middle School.

Clubs and organizations

Rocket Club
Formed during the 2006–07 school year, the club designs and builds model rockets. The team gained attention when it qualified to compete in the 2008 Team America Rocketry Challenge national competition, making the front page of the Seattle section of the Seattle Post-Intelligencer. The team finished 29th in the competition. The rocket club's success in the TARC challenge in 2009 and 2010 earned it the right to participate in NASA's Student Launch Projects. The school fielded one team (Project Rainier) in 2009–10, and two teams (Projects Adams and Olympus) in 2010–11. In 2015, the rocket club, having shrunk to two teams, sent both teams (Delta and Foxtrot) to TARC nationals, where Foxtrot placed 3rd and Delta 21st.

JSA Club
JSA, also known as Junior States of America, is a club at Ingraham High School. JSA is a part of a national organization which focuses on introducing high school age students to politics, activism, and debate. Ingraham JSA is a part of the PNW State, and frequently attends state-wide conventions.

HOSA Club
Formed during the 2020-21 school year by student Kally Chamberlain, the club's Public Health team placed 7th out of 8 at the State Leadership Contest.

Neuroscience Club
A popular club that focuses on providing a guided curriculum centered around the Brain Facts textbook.

Notable alumni
 Jay Inslee, current Washington Governor and Democratic candidate for presidency in the 2020 United States Presidential Election before dropping out
 David Horsey, two-time Pulitzer Prize winner in editorial cartooning
 Chuck Jackson, former MLB player (Houston Astros, Texas Rangers)
 Ken Phelps, baseball player
 Tim Paterson, programmer, original author of MS-DOS
 Bob Reynolds, former MLB player (Montreal Expos, Milwaukee Brewers, St. Louis Cardinals, Baltimore Orioles, Cleveland Indians, Detroit Tigers)
 Greg Lewis, All American football player at the University of Washington, drafted by and played for the Denver Broncos of the NFL
 John Urquhart, King County Sheriff
 Rudy Pantoja, political candidate and internet meme

References

External links

Ingraham High School website
IHS information from GreatSchools.net

1959 establishments in Washington (state)
Educational institutions established in 1959
High schools in King County, Washington
International Baccalaureate schools in Washington (state)
Public high schools in Washington (state)
Seattle Public Schools